Romi Spada was a Swiss bobsledder who competed in the early 1950s. He won a silver medal in the four-man event at the 1950 FIBT World Championships in Cortina d'Ampezzo.

References
Bobsleigh four-man world championship medalists since 1930

Swiss male bobsledders
Possibly living people
Year of birth missing
20th-century Swiss people